TiTi (Persian: تی تی‎) is a 2020 Iranian drama film directed by Ida Panahandeh and written by Panahandeh and Arsalan Amiri. The film screened for the first time at the 33rd Tokyo International Film Festival. In 2021, at the 39th Fajr Film Festival the film earned 3 nominations.

Cast 

 Elnaz Shakerdoost as TiTi
 Parsa Pirouzfar as Ebrahim
 Hootan Shakiba as Amir-Sassan
 Yahya Mardanshahi
 Soudabeh Jafarzadeh
 Hanieh Kazemi
 Mehdi Farizeh
 Reza Amouzad
 Zeynab Shabani
 Manouchehr Amiri
 Mahyar Daneshman

Reception

Accolades

References

External links 

 

2020s Persian-language films
2020 drama films
Iranian drama films